ʻAbd al-Munʻim (ALA-LC romanization of ) is a masculine given theophoric Arabic name that means "servant of the Most Benefactor or Granter (God)". The name is also rendered as Abdulmon'em, Abdulmonim, Abdulmunim, Abd al-Monem, Abdul Monem and others.

People
Notable people named ʻAbd al-Munʻim include:

Abdul Monem Khan (1899–1971), governor of East Pakistan
Abdul Monem (entrepreneur) (1937–2020), Bangladeshi industrialist
Prince Muhammad Abdel Moneim (1899-1979). Egyptian prince
Abdel Moneim Wahby (1911–1988), Egyptian basketball player
Abdel Moneim Amin (1912–1996), Egyptian military figure and politician
Abdelmunim al-Rifai (1917–1985), Lebanese-Jordanian diplomat and politician
Abdul Munim Riad (1919–1969), Egyptian general
Abdel Moneim Madbouly (1921–2006), Egyptian actor, comedian and playwright
Mohamed Abdel Moneim Al-Fayed, full name of Mohamed Al-Fayed (born 1933), Egyptian businessman
Qais Bin Abdul Munaim Al Zawawi (1935–1995), Omani politician
Abdel Moneim El-Guindi (born 1936), Egyptian boxer
Baker Abdel Munem (born 1942), Palestinian diplomat
Alaa El-Din Abdul Moneim (born 1951), Egyptian politician
Abdel-Moniem El-Ganayni (born 1960), Egyptian-American nuclear physicist
Hossam Abdelmoneim (born 1975), Egyptian footballer
Ahmed Adel Abd El-Moneam (born 1987), Egyptian footballer
Abdul Muneem Patel (born 1989), British alleged terrorist
Abdul Munim Wassel (died 2002), Egyptian soldier
Adnan Abd al-Munim al-Janabi, known as Adnan al-Janabi, Iraqi politician
Abd-al Mun'em Mustafa Halima Abu Basir, Syrian Islamist living in London

References

Arabic masculine given names